Giora Becher was Israel's Ambassador to Brazil from 2008 until 2011, Colombia from 2014 until 2015 and beginning in September 2000, Consul General to Philadelphia. He also served as Consul of Israel in Bombay and Israel's first Charge D’affairs in New Delhi, India.,

Biography
Born on February 7, 1950, in Kibbutz Misgav-Am, Becher lived most of his life in Netanya.  He earned a bachelor's degree from Tel Aviv University (psychology and political science), a master's degree in political science from the University of Haifa and the Israeli National Defense College.

References

External links
Article in Portuguese

Ambassadors of Israel to Brazil
People from Netanya
Ambassadors of Israel to Colombia
1950 births
Tel Aviv University alumni
University of Haifa alumni
Ambassadors of Israel to India
Living people